Aleksandr Yuryevich Saplinov (born 12 August 1997) is a Russian football player. He plays for FC Rostov. His main position is winger, and he also plays attacking midfielder and centre-forward.

Club career
He made his debut in the Russian Professional Football League for FC Energomash Belgorod on 20 July 2016 in a game against FC Avangard Kursk.

On 11 June 2019, he signed a 4-year contract with FC Rostov. He made his debut in the Russian Premier League for Rostov on 20 July 2019 in a game against FC Spartak Moscow, as an 80th-minute substitute for Ivelin Popov. In his first start for Rostov against FC Rubin Kazan on 25 August 2019, he scored a goal in the 87th minute, giving his club a 2–1 victory.

On 20 August 2020, he joined FC Rotor Volgograd on loan for the 2020–21 season. On 13 January 2021, the loan was terminated early.

On 24 June 2021, he moved to FC Ufa on loan with an option to buy. On 14 July 2022, Saplinov was loaned to FC Rubin Kazan.

Career statistics

References

External links
 
 
 Profile by Russian Professional Football League

1997 births
People from Stary Oskol
Sportspeople from Belgorod Oblast
Living people
Russian footballers
Association football midfielders
Association football forwards
FC Energomash Belgorod players
FC Sokol Saratov players
FC Baltika Kaliningrad players
FC Rostov players
FC Rotor Volgograd players
FC Ufa players
FC Rubin Kazan players
Russian Premier League players
Russian First League players
Russian Second League players